Adam Burrows is a noted professor of astrophysical sciences at Princeton University.

Education

Burrows received his undergraduate degree in physics from Princeton University and his Ph.D. in physics from the Massachusetts Institute of Technology.

Career
Adam Burrow's has a wife and one step-daughter and currently lives and the town of Princeton, New Jersey. Burrows's primary research interests are supernova theory, exoplanet and brown dwarf theory, planetary atmospheres, computational astrophysics, and nuclear astrophysics. Well known as a pioneer in the theory of exoplanets, brown dwarfs, and supernovae, he has written numerous fundamental and influential papers and reviews on these subjects during the last ~30 years. He has collaborated with more than 150 co-authors on more than 300 papers and given more than 300 invited talks and colloquia.

He is a past chair of the Board on Physics and Astronomy (BPA) of the National Research Council (NRC) of the National Academy of Sciences; was the BPA Liaison to the 2010 Decadal Survey of Astronomy; and has been a consultant for the American Museum of Natural History in New York.  He has served on the Committee on Astronomy and Astrophysics (CAA) of the NRC; on the NRC Rare Isotope Science Assessment Committee; on the Subcommittee on the Implementation of the DOE Long-Range Plan for Nuclear Physics; as the chair of the Kavli Institute for Theoretical Physics (KITP) advisory board; as the co-chair of NASA's Universe Subcommittee; as the chair of NASA's Origins Subcommittee; as a co-chair of NASA's Strategic Roadmapping Committee "Search for Earth-like Planets"; as a co-chair of NASA's Origins/SEUS Roadmapping committee; and as a primary author of NASA 2003 Origins Roadmap. Burrows is also the director of the Princeton Planets and Life Certificate Program and is on the board of trustees of the Aspen Center for Physics.

In 2011, Burrows delivered a talk, “Explosive Astrophysics: Supernovae and Gamma Ray Bursts,” at the first Starmus Festival in the Canary Islands. The talk was published in the book Starmus: 50 Years of Man in Space.

Honors and awards
Burrows is a fellow of the American Academy of Arts and Sciences, a fellow of the American Association for the Advancement of Science, a fellow of the American Physical Society (1992), and a fellow of the Princeton Center for Theoretical Science (PCTS), the 2010 Beatrice M. Tinsley Centennial Professor, and a former Alfred P. Sloan Fellow.

Selected papers

References

Living people
Princeton University faculty
Princeton University alumni
MIT Department of Physics alumni
Place of birth missing (living people)
Year of birth missing (living people)